The Campo (in Spanish: Río Campo) or Ntem River is a border river in Cameroon, mainland Equatorial Guinea and Gabon. It rises in Gabon, and flows into the Atlantic Ocean in Cameroon in the Bight of Biafra.

Towns 
 Campo
 Minvoul, Gabon

See also
Communes of Cameroon

References

Rivers of Cameroon
Rivers of Equatorial Guinea
Rivers of Gabon
International rivers of Africa
Cameroon–Equatorial Guinea border
Ramsar sites in Cameroon
Ramsar sites in Equatorial Guinea
Border rivers